Leslie King is the name of:

 Gerald Ford (1913–2006), born Leslie Lynch King, Jr., 38th President of the United States of America
 Leslie Lynch King, Sr. (1884–1941), biological father of Gerald Ford
 Leslie King (footballer) (born 1963), New Zealand women's footballer
 Leslie D. King (born 1949), Mississippi Supreme Court justice
 Leslie King (actor) (1876–1947), American actor in Orphans of the Storm, Alice in Wonderland
 Leslie King (cyclist) (1950–2009), Olympic cyclist for Trinidad and Tobago at the 1968 Summer Olympics
 Leslie King (sometimes credited as Leslie E. King), American actress and writer of the 1989 film To Die For and its sequel